Shane Sutherland (born 23 October 1990) is a Scottish professional footballer who plays as a striker for Scottish Championship club Inverness Caledonian Thistle. Sutherland has also previously played for Elgin City and Peterhead.

Career
Sutherland made his senior début for Elgin City in the Third Division on 23 January 2010, while on loan from Inverness Caledonian Thistle.

He was released by Inverness Caledonian Thistle at the end of the 2012–13 season, and signed for Elgin City in July 2013. After two season with Elgin, Sutherland moved to Scottish League One side Peterhead in June 2015, signing a one-year contract. At the end of his contract Sutherland returned to Borough Briggs for his third spell with Elgin. In January 2019 he returned to Peterhead.

On 16 January 2020, Elgin announced that Sutherland would be leaving at the conclusion of the 2019–20 season to rejoin his first club, Inverness Caledonian Thistle.

Career statistics

Honours

Individual
 PFA Scotland League Two Team of the Year (1): 2014–15
 Scottish League One Player of the Month (1): January 2016
 Scottish League Two Player of the Month (1): October 2016

References

External links
 

1990 births
Living people
Scottish footballers
Inverness Caledonian Thistle F.C. players
Elgin City F.C. players
Peterhead F.C. players
Scottish Football League players
Scottish Premier League players
Association football forwards
Sportspeople from Highland (council area)
Scottish Professional Football League players